Michael Jackson's Thriller may refer to:

 Thriller (album), 1982
 "Thriller" (song), a 1984 song by Michael Jackson from the above album
 Michael Jackson's Thriller (music video), the short film for the song
 "Thriller" (viral video), a 2007 video featuring prison inmates in Cebu, Philippines, recreating the dance from Michael Jackson's music video
 Thriller – Live, a musical featuring the music of the Jackson 5 and Michael Jackson

See also
Thriller (disambiguation)
Michael Jackson's Thriller jacket, jacket worn by Michael Jackson in the music video Michael Jackson's Thriller